Rasimah Ismail (born 1911) was an Indonesian activist and women's rights advocate who fought for independence during the Indonesian National Awakening era. Hailed from Bukittinggi, Minangkabau region, she was a friend of Rasuna Said, a National Hero. Both were once members of the Union of Indonesian Muslims (PERMI), a political party advocated for Islamic-nationalism and opposed to the colonialism.

Due to her persistent resistance against the Dutch colonial government, Rasimah and Rasuna were arrested and later deported to Semarang on June 9, 1933, aboard on SS van Linskhoten from Emma Haven port (today's Teluk Bayur port) in Padang. At the time, the two were around 22 years old, and they were sent off by thousands of supporters arrived from the whole Minangkabau.

Rasimah was a sister of Abdul Gaffar Ismail, an ulama and fighter against the colonialism. She was also an aunt of Taufiq Ismail, a poet.

References

1911 births
20th-century Muslim scholars of Islam
Indonesian feminists
Indonesian Muslims
Indonesian politicians
Indonesian revolutionaries
Minangkabau people
Year of death missing